Judge Bullock may refer to:

Frank William Bullock Jr. (born 1938), judge of the United States District Court for the Middle District of North Carolina
J. Russell Bullock (1815–1899), judge of the United States District Court for the District of Rhode Island after having served as a justice of the Supreme Court of Rhode Island